The Forecaster is a regional newspaper in southern Maine.  It is published weekly and distributed for free.  It publishes several different versions, including "The Forecaster" covering the city of Portland; "Northern Forecaster", which covers the towns north of Portland (Falmouth, Cumberland, Yarmouth, North Yarmouth, and Freeport; the "Southern Forecaster", which covers the towns south of Portland (South Portland, Cape Elizabeth, and Scarborough); and a "Mid-Coast" edition which covers towns farther east along the coast, including Brunswick, Topsham, Harpswell and Bath. It is owned by the Sun Media Group.

External links

 The Forecaster homepage

Newspapers published in Portland, Maine
Weekly newspapers published in the United States